The 2004 season was the Washington Redskins' 73rd in the National Football League. Although they improved on their 5–11 record from 2003 to 6–10, they finished bottom of their division and missed the playoffs for the fifth straight year. The season saw Joe Gibbs come out of retirement to return as head coach. The team acquired running back Clinton Portis in a trade that sent Champ Bailey to the Denver Broncos in the 2004 offseason. Week 8 marked the first time since 1932 that the U.S. presidential election went against the Redskins Rule.

Offseason

Free agency

Trades

Staff

NFL Draft

Final roster

Regular season
Due to the addition of the Houston Texans in 2002 and a subsequent change to the NFL's scheduling formula, the 2004 season was the first time since 1991 that the Redskins played the Cincinnati Bengals; the Bengals won the game, the first time they had done so at the Redskins.

Schedule

Game summaries

Week 2

Standings

References

Washington
Washington Redskins seasons
Red